The Achenbach House remains are located in Saddle River, Bergen County, New Jersey, United States. The house was built in 1757 by Johan George Achenbach and was added to the National Register of Historic Places on April 18, 1979. The house was the home of Larry Blyden and Carol Haney in the 1960s. It was owned (but never occupied) by travel pioneer Mario Perillo until his death in 2003, and subsequently passed on to a trust in his son Stephen Perillo's name, who is the present owner.  It was largely destroyed by fire in 2004, though a portion of the original structure remains intact as a guest cottage.

See also
National Register of Historic Places listings in Bergen County, New Jersey

References

External links
 Google Street View of the Achenbach House's remaining portion.

Houses on the National Register of Historic Places in New Jersey
Houses completed in 1757
Houses in Bergen County, New Jersey
National Register of Historic Places in Bergen County, New Jersey
Saddle River, New Jersey
New Jersey Register of Historic Places